The Fatherland League was a Norwegian right-wing, anti-communist political organisation in the interwar period. Founded in 1925, the movement aimed to unite all centre-to-right forces against the rise of the revolutionary Marxist labour movement. At its peak of popular support and political influence around 1930 it was the single largest mass movement ever organised on the political right in Norway, with an estimated 100,000 members. The movement began to decline through the 1930s, followed by some unsuccessful attempts to gain direct influence as a political party. The Fatherland League was banned and dissolved after the German occupation of Norway in 1940.

History

Mass movement

By the initiative of young industrialist Joakim Lehmkuhl, the organisation was co-founded with national hero Fridtjof Nansen and Norway's first Prime Minister Christian Michelsen. Former Prime Minister Jens Bratlie also joined the organisation. The Fatherland League's goal was a national coalition of all centre-to-right "bourgeoise" (borgerlige) and nationally minded forces, in opposition to the emerging revolutionary Marxist labour movement. The organisation gained particular support from the Free-minded Liberal Party and the Farmers' Party, while it was met with scepticism by the Conservative Party, and largely rejection by the Liberal Party. The labour movement in turn saw the organisation as a "seeding ground" for a fascist movement.

After the government crisis of 1926 and continued division among the centre-right parties, a "Nansen-petition" was launched by several influential people of different political backgrounds for a national unity government to be led by Nansen, an idea that was eventually endorsed by Nansen himself and by Lehmkuhl. The proposal fell through as Conservative and Liberal politicians reacted coldly to the idea, and quickly came to a new government agreement.

Following a strong surge of support and victory for the Labour Party (which had adopted a revolutionary ideology in 1918) in the 1927 parliamentary election, the Fatherland League launched a "thousand day's election campaign" towards the 1930 parliamentary election, a period which is considered the most important and successful in the history of the movement. The 1930 election resulted in Labour Party setbacks amid record voter turnouts, which the League assigned to its own credit, a view that was echoed by the Labour Party's Haakon Lie and Halvard Lange. The organisation peaked the same year with around 100,000 members and more than 400 local chapters.

Party attempt and decline
Increasingly seen as a political rival rather than a unifying force by the centre-right parties, the organisation effectively reorganised into a political party in 1933 after pressure from its young activists. At the same time it launched a more radical political program titled "A Norwegian program", and entered into secret, eventually unsuccessful negotiations of a "national block" with the Farmers' Party and the Free-minded People's Party (and briefly Nasjonal Samling which dropped out as it did not consider itself a borgerlig party). Following the onset of the Great Depression, Lehmkuhl and the party developed an economic ideology in part inspired by the American New Deal social program, emphasising a more planned economy. For the 1936 parliamentary election the party contested electoral lists in a few districts, both independently and together with the Free-minded, but did not win any representation.

The group declined in the late 1930s, partly due to the Labour Party abandoning its revolutionary ideology dating from 1918, and partly as an effect of the Nazi German-friendly attitude exhibited by several of its leading members as segments of the movement came under the influence of Italian fascism and German national socialism. In 1933, in response to the labour movement's long-standing use of uniforms, some of its young members marched in "greyshirts" for the first time at a local rally after the uniform had been launched by the party newspaper ABC. While the labour movement's uniforms had been tolerated for years, political use of uniforms was swiftly banned by the Liberal government the day after the rally. After the German invasion of Norway in April 1940, the remnants of the organisation attempted to establish a political alternative against the Quisling regime. The new chairman, Victor Mogens' secret talks and negotiations with the Germans remained unsuccessful. The organisation, like all other parties but Nasjonal Samling, was banned by Reichskommissar Josef Terboven on 25 September 1940.

The Fatherland League was not reorganised after the war. As the archives of the organisation were burned after its dissolution, limited historical material remains of it despite being the single largest mass movement ever organised on the political right in Norway. Anders Lange, founder of the modern Progress Party was active as the secretary of the organisation in Kristiansand and in Oslo until 1938.

Gallery

See also 

 Nasjonal Samling
 Progress Party
 Democrats in Norway

References

External links
 "De nationale instinkter" (in Norwegian), speech by Michelsen at the inaugural rally in Bergen on 25 January 1925
 "Ved stiftelsen av Fedrelandslaget" (in Norwegian), speech by Nansen at the inaugural rally in Oslo on 29 January 1925
 "Et nytt Norge" (in Norwegian), speech by Nansen at major rally in Tønsberg on 26 August 1928
 "Nansen stevne i Tønsberg. 26 august 1928" (YouTube), original newsreel of the event

 
1925 establishments in Norway
1940 disestablishments in Norway
Organizations established in 1925
Political parties established in 1933
Political parties disestablished in 1940
Anti-communist parties
Conservative parties in Norway
Nationalist parties in Norway
Corporatism
Defunct political parties in Norway